Aleksandr Gazov (born June 17, 1946) is a former Soviet sport shooter and Olympic champion.

He received a gold medal in 50 m Running Target at the 1976 Summer Olympics in Montreal. 

At the 1980 Summer Olympics in Moscow he received a bronze medal.

References

1946 births
Living people
Russian male sport shooters
Soviet male sport shooters
Running target shooters
Olympic shooters of the Soviet Union
Shooters at the 1976 Summer Olympics
Shooters at the 1980 Summer Olympics
Olympic gold medalists for the Soviet Union
Olympic medalists in shooting
Medalists at the 1980 Summer Olympics
Medalists at the 1976 Summer Olympics
Olympic bronze medalists for the Soviet Union